The Tauri were a people settled on the Crimea peninsula during the 1st millennium BC.

Tauri may also refer to 

The genitive form of taurus, e.g. in designations for stars in the constellation Taurus
Forum Tauri, later Forum of Theodosius, an area in ancient Constantinople
Ostreococcus tauri, a unicellular species of marine green alga
Tau'ri characters in Stargate (disambiguation)

See also
 Tauris (disambiguation)
 Taurus (disambiguation)